Swalls is an unincorporated community in Lost Creek Township, Vigo County, in the U.S. state of Indiana. It is part of the Terre Haute metropolitan area.

The town is home to Swalls Cemetery.

History
A post office was established at Swalls in 1891, and remained in operation until it was discontinued in 1900.

Geography

References

Unincorporated communities in Indiana
Unincorporated communities in Vigo County, Indiana
Terre Haute metropolitan area